The women's time trial took place at 13 October 2010 at the Noida Expressway. The race started at 10:30 and covered 29 km.

Final classification

External links
  13 October 2010
  Whitten pips Villumsen in Delhi. October 13, Women's Time Trial: 29km cyclingnews.com

Cycling at the 2010 Commonwealth Games
2010 in women's road cycling
Road cycling at the Commonwealth Games
Cyc